Metretopus is a genus of insects belonging to the family Metretopodidae.

The species of this genus are found in Europe, Russia and Northern America.

Species:
 Metretopus alter Bengtsson, 1930 
 Metretopus borealis (Eaton, 1871)

References

Mayflies
Mayfly genera